Trevilla is a hamlet in the parish of Feock, Cornwall, England, United Kingdom.

Trevilla is also a farm in the parish of St Juliot, Cornwall.

See also

 List of farms in Cornwall

References

External links
 

Hamlets in Cornwall
Farms in Cornwall